The 1942 South Carolina Gamecocks football team was an American football team that represented the University of South Carolina as a member of the Southern Conference during the 1942 college football season. In their fifth season under head coach Rex Enright, the Gamecocks compiled an overall record of 1–7–1 with a mark of 1–4 in conference play, placing 14th in the SoCon. The team's only victory was over The Citadel.

Schedule

References

South Carolina
South Carolina Gamecocks football seasons
South Carolina Gamecocks football